is a district located in Hiroshima Prefecture, Japan. The district has an estimated population of 11,863. The total area is 381.81 km2. (As of March 31, 2007)

The district has one town
Jinsekikōgen

District villages as of incorporation in 1889
 Age
 Arugi
 Ueno
 Ono
 Kami
 Kamitoyomatsu
 Kameishi
 Kitsuwa
 Kusagi
 Kurumi
 Kobatake (location of district offices until 1889)
 Sasao
 Shimotoyomatsu
 Shinsaka
 Sumomo
 Takafuta
 Takamitsu
 Tandō
 Chikada
 Chichikino
 Tsunemitsu
 Nakadaira
 Nagato
 Hanazumi
 Fukunaga
 Furukawa
 Maki
 Mitsusue
 Mitsunobu
 Yuki
(30 villages in all)

Timeline
1889年 4月1日 市町村制施行。当時の町村数は30村。
July 1, 1897 The villages of Arugi, Kamitoyomatsu, Sasao, Shimotoyomatsu, and Nakadaira merge to form Toyomatsu Village (26 villages in district)
July 11, 1897 Ueno, Sumomo, Chikada, and Hanazumi Villages merge to form Sen'yō Village (23 villages in district)
August 1, 1917 Yuki Village becomes a town (1 town, 22 villages in district)
1940年 11月10日 草木・田頭・福永・牧各村が合併（新設合併）し、牧村（2代）が成立する（1町19村）。
1942年 4月1日 阿下・上・亀石・小畠・常光各村が合併（新設合併）し、小畠村（2代）が成立する（1町15村）。
1943年 4月1日 高光・古川両村が合併（新設合併）し、高光村（2代）が成立する（1町14村）。
1944年 1月1日 木津和・高蓋・父木野・光末・光信各村が合併（新設合併）し、高蓋村（2代）が成立する（1町10村）。
1949年 7月1日 高蓋村が 芦品郡 大正村桑木（くわぎ）を編入する。
March 31, 1954 The village of Takafuta added parts of the village of Shinami in Kōnu District.
1954年 11月3日 高光・牧両村が合併（新設合併）し、神石町 が成立する（2町8村）。
1955年 3月31日 来見・小畠・高蓋各村が合併（新設合併）し、三和町 が成立する（3町5村）。
1955年3月31日 神石町が永渡村を編入する（3町4村）。
April 1, 1955 The town of Yuki and the village of Ono and parts of Shinsaka油木町（初代）及び小野村全域、新坂村のうち新免・三坂の各一部が合併（新設合併）し、油木町（2代）が成立する（3町2村）。
March 31, 1956 The town of Yuki and the village of Senyō merged to form the town of Yuki (3rd Generation) (3 towns, 1 village).
July 1, 1959 The town of Sanwa added parts of the village of Fujio from Asashina District.
November 5, 2004 The towns of Sanwa, Jinseki and Yuki, and the village of Toyomatsu merged to form the new town of Jinsekikōgen (1 town).

Jinseki District